The Wetterkreuzberg is a hill in the Haardt range on the eastern edge of the Palatine Forest in the German state of Rhineland-Palatinate.

Location 
The Wetterkreuzberg, like the Breitenberg (545.2 m), the Taubenkopf (603.8 m) and the Kanzel (531.7 m), is one of the outlying peaks of the Kalmit massif (672.6 m). It is located in an exposed location right on the edge of the Haardt so that, despite its low elevation, it is seen from places in the Rhine Plain as a prominent peak. To the north the hill is linked to the Kanzel over a shallow saddle. At the summit is a chapel to St. Mary (the Maria-Schutz-Kapelle) which is visible from a long way off. The hill belongs to the parish of Maikammer.

The Kalmitstraße road, which runs from Maikammer to the Hüttenhohl runs across the hill. Just below the summit there is a walker's car park. The summit may be gained on footpaths from the Maikammer hamlet of Alsterweiler, from St. Martin or even from the Klausental Hut.

Gallery

References

External links 

Mountains and hills of the Palatinate Forest
Maikammer
Mountains and hills of Rhineland-Palatinate